Springdale is an unincorporated community in Cassia County in the U.S. state of Idaho. The Snake River flows immediately north of Springdale.

References

Burley, Idaho micropolitan area
Unincorporated communities in Cassia County, Idaho
Unincorporated communities in Idaho